This list of the tallest buildings in Tel Aviv ranks buildings in Tel Aviv, Israel by their height. Tel Aviv is the second-largest city in the State of Israel. Some of the tallest buildings in Israel are located in Tel Aviv as well as Ramat Gan. Tel Aviv is noted for its recent development as a hub in high-rise buildings due to its soaring price of real estate. Almost all the buildings above 100 metres were built within the past two decades.

From 1965 to 1999, Israel's first skyscraper, the Shalom Meir Tower, was the country's tallest building. The current tallest building in Tel Aviv is the Azrieli Sarona Tower.

Tallest buildings

Above 150 m
This height includes spires and architectural details but does not include antenna masts. An equal sign (=) following a rank indicates the same height between two or more buildings; they are listed in order of floor count, then alphabetically. The "Year" column indicates the year in which a building was completed.

120–150 m

Tallest under construction or proposed 
This lists buildings that are under construction in Tel Aviv and are planned to rise at least 120 metres (394 ft). Any buildings that have been topped out but are not completed are also included.

Under Construction

Proposed

Timeline of tallest buildings
This is a list of buildings that once held the title of tallest building in Tel Aviv.

See also 
List of tallest buildings in Israel
List of tallest buildings in Ramat Gan

References

 
Tel Aviv
Architecture in Israel
Tallest